Bienville House, or the Bienville House Hotel, is a hotel in the French Quarter of New Orleans, Louisiana.  Its building dates from 1835.  It was converted to a hotel in 1967.

The building began as Planters Rice Mill in 1835. It later became a syrup factory, a hotel, a firehouse, and an apartment building known as the Royal Bienville. The Monteleone family purchased the building in 1972 and converted it into the Bienville House Hotel.

A Tiki-themed bar and restaurant opened in the hotel in 2014.

It is a member of the Historic Hotels of America.

References

External links
Bienville House Hotel, official site

Hotels in Louisiana
New Orleans
Historic Hotels of America